Escoffier is a surname of French origin. Notable people with the surname include:
 Alain Escoffier (1949–1977), French anti-communist activist and martyr
 Anne-Marie Escoffier (born 1942), French politician
 Auguste Escoffier (1846–1935), French chef, the father of cuisine classique style of haute cuisine
 Jean-Yves Escoffier (1950-2003), French cinematographer
 Jeffrey Escoffier (1942—2022), American author, activist, and media strategist
 Kevin Escoffier (born 1980), French professional sailor
 Louis-Casimir Escoffier, known as Casimir Ney (1801–1877), French composer and violist

See also
 
 Auguste Escoffier School of Culinary Arts
 Ritz-Escoffier School

French-language surnames